TVyNovelas is a Mexican magazine published by Editorial Televisa on a monthly basis. Like soap opera publications in the United States such as Soap Opera Digest and Soaps In Depth, it mainly carries coverage of Mexican and international telenovelas, mainly those airing on the networks of Televisa.

History and profile
TVyNovelas was established in 1982. Four international editions are also published: United States, Puerto Rico, Argentina, Chile and Colombia. It is considered the leader among showbusiness publications in Mexico, especially on the subject of telenovelas. The magazine also gives awards to the best telenovelas and TV shows of the year ("Premios TVyNovelas") broadcast by Televisa in Mexico and Univision in the United States.

See also
 Telenovela Database

References

External links
(es) 

1982 establishments in Mexico
Magazines about soap operas
Magazines established in 1982
Magazines published in Mexico
Monthly magazines published in Mexico
Spanish-language magazines
Television magazines